Pacific Coastal Airlines is a Canadian regional airline that operates scheduled, charter and cargo services to destinations in British Columbia. Its head office is located in the South Terminal of Vancouver International Airport in Richmond, British Columbia. Its main base is Vancouver International Airport.

History 

The original Pacific Coastal Airlines was established in 1956 as Cassidair Services, operating from its base at the airport in Cassidy, now Nanaimo Airport, south of Nanaimo. In early 1980, the airline was acquired by Jim Pattison Industries and absorbed into Airwest Airlines, also recently acquired by Pattison. At the time of the acquisition, Pacific Coastal was operating on the Nanaimo-Vancouver, Victoria-Nanaimo-Comox-Campbell River-Port Hardy, and Nanaimo-Qualicum-Port Alberni routes. On November 1, 1980, Airwest and several other local airlines recently acquired by Pattison were merged into Air BC.

The current Pacific Coastal Airlines was established in 1987 by the merger of Powell Air and the Port Hardy division of Air BC. It acquired the shares and assets of Wilderness Seaplanes on April 1, 1998.

A new airline division, Wilderness Seaplanes, which started service on May 5, 2016 was established to take over the Pacific Coastal Airlines Seaplane Division and is based at Port Hardy and Bella Bella.

On November 24, 2017, WestJet and Pacific Coastal announced a code sharing agreement to operate Saab 340 aircraft under the WestJet Link brand commencing in June 2018. These aircraft are based at the WestJet hub at Calgary International Airport and serve destinations such as Lethbridge and Lloydminster with aircraft also being based at Vancouver International Airport with service to Cranbrook, and Comox.

Destinations in British Columbia

As of January 2023, Pacific Coastal Airlines operates services to the following seventeen destinations in British Columbia:

Anahim Lake (Anahim Lake Airport)
Bella Bella (Bella Bella (Campbell Island) Airport)
Bella Coola (Bella Coola Airport)
Campbell River (Campbell River Airport)
Comox (Comox Airport)
Cranbrook (Cranbrook/Canadian Rockies International Airport)   Ending April 28, 2023 
Kelowna (Kelowna International Airport)
Masset (Masset Airport)
Penticton (Penticton Regional Airport)
Port Hardy (Port Hardy Airport)
Powell River (Powell River Airport)
Prince George (Prince George Airport)
Tofino (Tofino/Long Beach Airport)
Trail (Trail Airport)
Vancouver (Vancouver International Airport) hub
Victoria (Victoria International Airport)
Williams Lake (Williams Lake Airport)

Fleet
As of January 2023, Pacific Coastal Airlines had twenty-three aircraft registered with Transport Canada, plus six registered to Wilderness Seaplanes:

Incidents and accidents
On August 3, 2008, a Grumman G-21 Goose aircraft with seven passengers and crew crashed during a flight from Port Hardy to Chamiss Bay. The aircraft was completely destroyed by a fire. There were only two survivors.
On November 16, 2008, a Grumman G-21 Goose aircraft with seven passengers and one pilot crashed on South Thormanby Island off British Columbia's Sunshine Coast, during a flight from Vancouver International Airport to Toba Inlet. The plane was flown into a hillside and exploded into a mass of burning wreckage according to the lone survivor, who was rescued by the Canadian Coast Guard.

References

External links 

 
 

Airlines established in 1956
Airlines established in 1987
Canadian companies established in 1956
Canadian companies established in 1987
Regional airlines of British Columbia
Air Transport Association of Canada
Companies based in Richmond, British Columbia
Seaplane operators
1956 establishments in British Columbia
1987 establishments in British Columbia